Gulzhan Issanova (born 12 September 1983) is a Kazakhstani judoka, born in Karaganda.

She won a bronze medal in the open weight class category of the 2006 Asian Games, having defeated Angom Anita Chanu of India in the bronze medal match. She also finished fifth in the heavyweight (+78 kg) category.

She currently resides in Almaty.

References

External links
 
 

1983 births
Living people
Sportspeople from Karaganda
Kazakhstani female judoka
Judoka at the 2008 Summer Olympics
Judoka at the 2012 Summer Olympics
Olympic judoka of Kazakhstan
Judoka at the 2006 Asian Games
Judoka at the 2010 Asian Games
Judoka at the 2018 Asian Games
Asian Games silver medalists for Kazakhstan
Asian Games bronze medalists for Kazakhstan
Asian Games medalists in judo
Medalists at the 2006 Asian Games
Medalists at the 2010 Asian Games
Medalists at the 2018 Asian Games
Universiade medalists in judo
Universiade bronze medalists for Kazakhstan
Medalists at the 2009 Summer Universiade
21st-century Kazakhstani women